"Take Me Back to Dear Old Blighty" is a music hall song written by Arthur J. Mills, Fred Godfrey and Bennett Scott in 1916. It was popular during the First World War, and tells a story of three fictional soldiers on the Western Front suffering from homesickness and their longing to return to "Blighty" - a slang term for Britain.

Composition
Fred Godfrey wrote the song with Bennett Scott and A.J. Mills after passing a music hall in Oxford where a show called Blighty was showing. He recounts: "One of us suddenly said “What an idea for a song!” Four hours later it was all finished, and the whole country was singing it soon afterwards. I got — not very much."

The chorus lyric "Take me back to dear old Blighty/Put me on the train for London town" was included in The Oxford Dictionary of Quotations.

Recordings
Recordings by Florrie Forde and Ella Retford are the most commonly heard versions, though Dorothy Ward first sang it. 

Jolly Old Fellows performed the song in 1930.

British singer Kevin Coyne also released a version on his 1978 album Dynamite Daze, with piano accompaniment by Tim Rice.

Use in other media
Noël Coward used the song for his 1931 stage production Cavalcade, about British life in the first two decades of the twentieth century and in the 1944 film This Happy Breed. It was also used in the 1954 Errol Flynn film Lilacs in the Spring.

A recording of the song by Cicely Courtneidge from the 1962 film The L-Shaped Room was sampled at the beginning of the title track of the album The Queen Is Dead by the Smiths.

A version called "Bring it back to Blighty", with different lyrics, was recorded as the England song for the 2010 World Cup.

The song was also used in the 2006 film Flyboys.

The song is heard in part of the opening scene of the 2021 movie Six Minutes to Midnight in the background.

References

1916 songs
Songs of World War I
Songs about the United Kingdom
British songs
Songs written by Fred Godfrey